Meet the Ancestors (later Ancestors) is a BBC Television documentary series first broadcast in 1998. It documented the archaeological excavation and scientific reconstruction of human remains.  The series was introduced by archaeologist Julian Richards and often included facial reconstructions by Caroline Wilkinson.

A follow-up to the series, Stories from the Dark Earth: Meet the Ancestors Revisited, was broadcast in 2014 on BBC Four.

Companion book

Notes
The series was renamed Ancestors for its seventh season.

Episodes

Series one (1998)

Series two (1999)

Specials (1999)

Series three (2000)

Canterbury special (2000)

Series four (2001)

Series five (2002)

New Year special (2003)

Series six (2003)

Series seven (2004)

External links 
 
 

BBC television documentaries about history
1998 British television series debuts
2004 British television series endings
1990s British documentary television series
2000s British documentary television series